Walking Through History is a British television documentary history programme that ran for four series on Channel 4 and was presented by actor Tony Robinson. It first aired in March 2013.

History
Channel 4 commissioned the series Walking Through History as a new vehicle for actor and comedian Tony Robinson after the cancellation of Time Team.

The programme was devised as a 60-mile walk, with each series aiming to be made up of four parts, with each walk highlighting history from different eras along the path taken.

Episode List

Series 1

^Not available as not in the Top 30 programs on Channel 4 that week.

Series 2

^Not available as not in the Top 30 programs on Channel 4 that week.

Series 3

Series 4

^Not available as not in the Top 30 programs on Channel 4 that week.

References

2013 British television series debuts
2014 British television series endings
2010s British documentary television series
Channel 4 original programming
English-language television shows